Ernst Weinland (9 March 1869, Hohenwittlingen – 17 October 1932, Urach) was a German physiologist and parasitologist.

He studied medicine at the universities of Munich, Tübingen, Berlin and Leipzig. He also studied zoology, and in the process earned a PhD at the University of Berlin. After finishing his medical studies at Leipzig, he worked as an assistant physician in Esslingen and as an assistant in the laboratory of Karl von Voit at the University of Munich. In 1899 he obtained his habilitation for physiology and afterwards became an associate professor at the technical school in Freising. From 1913 to 1932 he was a professor of physiology at the University of Erlangen.

He is known for his pioneer research involving the metabolism of parasitic nematodes (Ascaris). He also published papers on the metabolism of the fly genus Calliphora.

Selected writings 
 Beiträge zur Kenntnis des Baues des Dipteren-Schwingers, 1890.
 Ueber die Bildung von Glykogen nach Galactosefütterung (Z. Biol., 1900, 40, 374— 385) – Formation of glycogen after feeding on galactose.
 Ueber die Lactase des Pankreas. Zweite Mittheilung zur Frage nach den Ursachen, welche die Bildung der Lactase hervorrufen, Ibid., 1900, n. F., xxii, 386-391 – On lactase of the pancreas.
 Ueber den Glykogengchalt einiger parasitischer Würmer, (Z. Biol. Bd. XLI. 1901. Heft 1. p. 69—74). 
 Ueber ausgepresste Extrakte von Ascaris lumbricoides und ihre Wirkung. (Z. Biol., 48, 86. — 1902).

References 

1869 births
1932 deaths
People from Bad Urach
Academic staff of the University of Erlangen-Nuremberg
German parasitologists
German physiologists